John F. McBride (November 30, 1901–October 11, 1966) was an American football player who played the positions of halfback, fullback, and quarterback in the National Football League (NFL). He was born in Conshohocken, Pennsylvania. McBride played collegiately at Syracuse University where he finished second in the nation in scoring in his senior year to Heinie Benkert. McBride scored 90 points on 7 touchdowns, 11 field goals, and 15 extra points in his senior year.

McBride played 10 seasons in the NFL, leading the Giants in scoring in each of their first three seasons (1925–27), and the NFL in scoring in 1927. As a passer, McBride ended his career with 3,123 yards passing, 31 touchdown passes, and 57 interceptions. As a rusher McBride totalled 2,093 yards rushing, and 26 rushing touchdowns, while averaging 4.2 yards a carry.

McBride maintained his connection with pro football after his career in the NFL serving as the player/coach of the Paterson Panthers (later of the American Association) in 1935 and as coach of the New York Yankees of the second American Football League and the New York Yankees of the third AFL in 1940-1941.

Images

See also
 History of the New York Giants (1925–78)

References

External links
Career statistics at jt-sw.com
Career statistics at databasefootball.com
Jack McBride's profile at NFL.com

1901 births
Year of death missing
People from Conshohocken, Pennsylvania
Players of American football from Pennsylvania
American football running backs
American football quarterbacks
Syracuse Orange football players
New York Giants players
Providence Steam Roller players
Brooklyn Dodgers (NFL) players